Elena Roos (born 1991) is a female orienteering competitor who runs for Switzerland. She won her first World Championship medal at the 2017 World Orienteering Championships, receiving a bronze in the Mixed Sprint Relay along with Sabine Hauswirth, Martin Hubmann and Florian Howald. In the same year, she won the silver medal at The World Games 2017 in Wroclaw, Poland.

She runs for Orientisti 92 Piano di Magadino (Ticino, Switzerland) and Halden SK (Norway)

References

External links
 
 

1991 births
Living people
Swiss orienteers
Female orienteers
Foot orienteers
World Orienteering Championships medalists
World Games silver medalists
World Games bronze medalists
Competitors at the 2017 World Games
Competitors at the 2022 World Games
World Games medalists in orienteering
20th-century Swiss women
21st-century Swiss women